Lao is a Unicode block containing characters for the languages of Laos. The characters of the Lao block are allocated so as to be equivalent to the similarly positioned characters of the Thai block immediately preceding it.

Block

History
The following Unicode-related documents record the purpose and process of defining specific characters in the Lao block:

References 

Unicode blocks
Lao language